(The) Lost Children may refer to:

Film and television
 Lost Children (1956 film), Czechoslovakia
 Lost Children (2005 film), a documentary about child soldiers
 The Lost Children (TV series), New Zealand
 "The Lost Children", a 1983 episode of Dungeons and Dragons

Music
 The Lost Children (album) by Disturbed (2011)
 "The Lost Children", a song from Michael Jackson's 2001 album Invincible

Other uses
 The Lost Children (fairy tale)

See also
 
 Lost Boys (disambiguation)
 Lost Girls (disambiguation)
 Stolen Children (disambiguation)
 Lost children of Francoism